Harold Wallace Cooper (August 29, 1913 – June 25, 1977) was a Canadian ice hockey player.

Career
Cooper played eight games with the New York Rangers during the 1944-45 NHL season. He was 5'5" tall and weighed 155 lbs. He also played in the American Hockey League for the Providence Reds and the Hershey Bears and also in the United States Hockey League for the Houston Skippers.

References

External links

1913 births
1977 deaths
Canadian expatriate ice hockey players in the United States
Canadian ice hockey right wingers
Hershey Bears players
Houston Skippers players
Ice hockey people from Ontario
New York Rangers players
Providence Reds players
Sportspeople from Temiskaming Shores